Weishampel is the name of several people

John Frederick Weishampel (1808–1883), minister
John Frederick Weishampel Jr.
David B. Weishampel (born 1952), paleobiologist/paleontologist

Weishampel can also be spelled

Weishample (alternative American spelling and the name of the town Weishample, Pennsylvania)
Weisshaubl (traditional German spelling)